Western Australia is one of the states of Australia, and has established several state symbols and emblems.

Official symbols

See also
 List of symbols of states and territories of Australia
 Australian state colours

References

 Symbols - Department of the Premier and Cabinet Retrieved 18 March 2018.